Roll Over is a 1985 song by the Thompson Twins. It was intended for release as a single from the band's album Here's To Future Days, but was recalled and withdrawn from shelves the same day of release with the remaining copies destroyed. Some copies made it onto the market before being recalled. After a bout with nervous exhaustion which left him with no reflexes, lead vocalist Tom Bailey took it as a bad omen and decided against the release of the song. Subsequently, it was only released on the North American versions of the album. The versions found on the single are different mixes than the final album version which was co-produced by Nile Rodgers.

The B-side, a semi-instrumental version of "King For A Day" titled "Fools In Paradise", was exclusive to this single.

Formats
7" UK vinyl single (Arista TWINS 8)
"Roll Over" - 4:55
"Fools In Paradise" - 4:45

12" UK vinyl single (Arista TWINS 128)
"Roll Over (Again)" - 6:50
"Fools In Paradise" - 5:25

Official versions

Personnel 
Written by  Tom Bailey, Alannah Currie, and Joe Leeway.
Tom Bailey – vocals, piano, Fairlight, synthesizers, guitar, contrabass, Fairlight and drum programming
Alannah Currie – lyrics, marimba, backing vocals, acoustic drums, percussion, tuned percussion
Joe Leeway – backing vocals, congas, percussion
Steve Stevens – additional guitars
 Produced by Tom Bailey assisted by Joe Leeway and Alannah Currie
 Co-produced, recorded and mixed by John ' Tokes' Potoker
 Photography – Paul Cox
 Artwork/Design – Andie Airfix, Satori
 Art Direction – Alannah

Album version:
 Produced by Nile Rodgers & Tom Bailey
 Mixed by James Farber
 Mixed at Skyline Studio, NYC

References

1985 singles
Thompson Twins songs
Songs written by Alannah Currie
Songs written by Tom Bailey (musician)
Song recordings produced by Nile Rodgers
Songs written by Joe Leeway
1985 songs
Arista Records singles